The Nikon D500 is a 20.9-megapixel enthusiast digital single-lens reflex camera using an APS-C sensor. It was announced by Nikon Corporation on January 6, 2016 along with the Nikon D5 full frame camera. D500 replaced the D300S as Nikon's DX format flagship DSLR. On February 23, 2017, at CP+ show, a special edition was released for Nikon's 100th anniversary.
The D500 jointly won a Camera Grand Prix Japan 2017 Editors Award.  The camera was discontinued on February 1, 2022.

Features
 4K UHD video in 30p, 25p, and 24p
 Magnesium alloy and carbon fiber weather-sealed body
 Active D-Lighting (three levels)
 Retouch menu includes filter type, hue, crop, D-lighting, Mono (Black and White, Cyanotype or Sepia)
 Multi-CAM 20K autofocus module with 153 sensors in normal mode with 99 cross-type sensors. Of these points, 15 will work with any lens/teleconverter combination with a maximum aperture of 8 or larger.
 Of the 153 points, 55 are user-selectable; 35 of those points are cross-type, and 9 will work down to 8.
 Focus points' low-light performance: -4EV (central focus point) and -3EV (other 152 focus points)
 Auto AF fine-tune achieves focus tuning in live view through automatic setting of adjustment value with a few button operations.
 Live View Mode
 Built-in sensor cleaning (using ultrasound) helps to remove the dust from sensor
 10-pin remote and flash sync terminals on camera
 File formats include JPEG, TIFF, NEF (Nikon's raw image format compressed and uncompressed), and JPEG+NEF (JPEG size/quality selectable)
 Dual memory card slots (one SD and one XQD). The SD slot is the first in any Nikon camera to support the UHS-II bus. As of "C" firmware update 1.30 support has been added for CFexpress cards (Type B) in the XQD slot. 
 The D500 can be set to automatically delay its shutter release to compensate for flickering electric lighting. It is the first Nikon camera to include this feature, which was initially absent from the professional D5 announced on the same date. This feature was added to the D5 via a June 2016 firmware update. 

With the camera's initial firmware version Wi-Fi only worked with Nikon's proprietary "SnapBridge" app, this also applies other Nikon models. Since a firmware updated in May 2019 Wi-Fi was opened to third party applications.

References

External links

 Nikon D500, Nikon USA
 Nikon D500 User Manuals, Guides and Software Nikon Download-center
 Technical Solutions | D500 TIPS Nikon

D500
D500
Live-preview digital cameras
Cameras introduced in 2016